The Carmen de Patagones school shooting occurred on 28 September 2004 at the "Islas Malvinas" Institute in Carmen de Patagones, Buenos Aires Province, Argentina. Rafael Solich, 15, killed three fellow students and wounded five more.

Background
Solich is the son of Rafael Solich and Esther Pangue. His father nicknamed him "Juniors", after the Buenos Aires football club Boca Juniors. His father was involved in the Argentine Naval Prefecture, and Solich took his gun to commit the shootings.

Solich had one friend, Dante, and the pair communicated in English to keep private. Classmates said that the pair listened to Marilyn Manson and wore black, and would draw Satanic imagery such as inverted crosses.

Events
The morning of Tuesday 28 September 2004, in the middle school N°202 "Islas Malvinas" in Carmen de Patagones, a 15-year-old student named Rafael Solich, known as "Junior", opened fire upon his classmates in their classroom. The massacre took place at 7:35, the time at which classes started. Solich entered the institute in which around 400 students attended class, hiding a Browning Hi-Power 9mm pistol (which belonged to his father, subofficial of the Argentine Naval Prefecture), two full magazines and a hunting knife hidden in a military coat.

In the classroom 1° B, Solich stood up in front of the class, took the gun, and discharged the entire magazine upon his classmates without saying a word. After emptying the magazine, he headed for the hall, loaded a second magazine and shot again, this time for the person in charge of the school buffet, who he did not manage to injure.

He kept walking through the main hall until Dante Pena, one of his classmates and best friends, tackled him and removed his weapon. After the authorities were warned, he did not resist, was arrested and transferred to the port city of Bahía Blanca.

Because of the attack, three of his classmates died, aged between 15 and 16, and five other students were injured. The then-president Néstor Kirchner described the episode as "painful" and declared two national days of mourning.

In all the schools in the country, an event of reflection was held, where a letter sent by the Ministry of Education was read for everyone.

Victims
3 Students were killed and 5 were injured during the attack in the classroom.

The 3 students that died were. 

 Federico Ponce, 15
 Sandra Núñez, 16
Evangelina Miranda , 16

Proceedings
Solich told a judge, "I remember some of it...no, I don't know. Actually, it went really quickly". He did not sleep the night before the attack, confessing that he was nervous. He did not show anyone his gun, but displayed his knife to Dante. Although he would not answer when asked for his motive, he revealed that he had been angry with his peers since kindergarten and had been planning an attack since the seventh grade: "they say that I am strange...they fuck with me because I have this spot on my nose".

His father was jailed for 45 days and made to relinquish his firearm.

Aftermath
Solich was treated for a personality disorder. He was kept in psychiatric care until 2007, when he was given liberty from the hospital in La Plata for a weekly ration of hours: first 24, then 48, then 96. As of September 2014, he did not work or study. A female survivor of the attack saw him in the streets of the city, and subsequently suffered panic attacks and required therapy. Before his location was discovered, Argentine media speculated on it.

Solich's family were evacuated from Carmen de Patagones immediately after the attack. Dante was deemed by the community to have had prior knowledge of the attack, and was ostracised, with parents threatening to not send their children back to school if he were there; eventually, he and his family were also moved out of town.

The families of the victims sued the Naval Prefecture and the province's Schools Department for 12 million Argentine pesos.

References

School shootings committed by pupils
Murder in Argentina
Murder committed by minors
2004 in Argentina
2004 murders in Argentina
History of Buenos Aires Province
Education in Buenos Aires Province
September 2004 events in South America
School shootings in South America
2004 mass shootings in South America
Attacks in South America in 2004